Damian Szuprytowski (born 25 June 1989) is a Polish professional footballer who plays as an attacking midfielder for Pogoń Siedlce.

Football

Lechia Gdańsk
Born in Malbork Szuprytowski started his footballing trade with the youth levels of Pomezania Malbork. He joined the Lechia Gdańsk academy set up in 2006, quickly finding himself playing in the Młoda Ekstraklasa, the highest division in the Under 21's league. In total he played 34 times for Lechia in the youth leagues. His first break at the professional leagues was with the Lechia Gdańsk II team playing in the IV liga and making his debut against Wietcis Skarszewy. His debut in the Ekstraklasa came later that year coming off the bench against Lech Poznań on 28 April 2010. Despite the promise of big things, Szuprytowski went on to make a total of 4 appearances for the first team, with his only start coming in his last appearance for the first team, in a 2-1 home defeat to Jagiellonia Białystok. Szuprytowski was contracted to the club for two more seasons but failed to make a first team appearance again, playing for the second team and spending time on loan at Górnik Polkowice in the I liga where he managed to make 8 appearances.

Lower divisions

Szuprytowski's left Lechia in 2012, having a relatively successful 18-month spell with Concordia Elbląg. He played consistently with Concordia in the II liga, playing a total of 52 times for the club. During the January transfer window he joined Świt Nowy Dwór Mazowiecki, playing 15 times for Świt. A reshuffling of the leagues after 2013-14 season saw 10 teams being relegated from both the East and Western divisions, seeing both clubs Szuprytowski played for that season being relegated as the bottom two teams. After relegation he joined Olimpia Elbląg, spending the next four seasons with the club. In his first season the team finished 2nd in their group in the III liga, winning their group the following season. The 2016–17 season proved to be a successful one for Olimpia, finishing 1 place outside of the playoffs in 5th, consolidating their place in the league the season after finishing in 6th. Despite having a successful time with Olimpia, in which he made over 100 appearances, he moved to join Radomiak Radom during the summer transfer window. The season started well for Radomiak and Szuprytowski, with the latter making 16 appearances and scoring 4 goals before the winter break. During the break Szuprytowski moved back on loan to Olimpia Elbląg. Despite the move away from Radomiak, his contribution helped the team to win the league. After the season Szuprytowski returned to Olimpia Elbląg on a permanent basis.

Honours
Olimpia Elbląg
III liga (Group V): 2015–16

Radomiak Radom
II liga: 2018–19

External links

References

1989 births
Living people
Polish footballers
Ekstraklasa players
I liga players
II liga players
III liga players
IV liga players
Pomezania Malbork players
Lechia Gdańsk players
Lechia Gdańsk II players
Górnik Polkowice players
Świt Nowy Dwór Mazowiecki players
Olimpia Elbląg players
Radomiak Radom players
MKP Pogoń Siedlce players
People from Malbork
Sportspeople from Pomeranian Voivodeship
Association football midfielders